The Dominican Republic national rugby union team represents the Dominican Republic in rugby union. The team's first international match was played against the British Virgin Islands in February 2000.

Record

Overall

See also
Rugby union in the Dominican Republic
Dominican Rugby Federation
Dominican Republic national rugby union team (sevens)

External links
 Fedorugby Official website

References

Rugby union in the Dominican Republic
Caribbean national rugby union teams
rugby